Baileys Corner may refer to:

Baileys Corner, Indiana
Baileys Corner, New Jersey